The Kalachuris of Ratnapura were a central Indian dynasty during 11th and 12th centuries. They ruled parts of present-day Chhattisgarh from their capital at Ratnapura (modern Ratanpur in Bilaspur district). They were an offshoot of the Kalachuris of Tripuri, and ruled as vassals of the parent dynasty for many years.

History 

Several inscriptions and coins of the Ratnapura branch have been found, but these do not provide enough information to reconstruct the political history of the region with complete certainty.

According to the 1114 CE Ratanpur inscription of Jajjaladeva I, the Tripuri Kalachuri king Kokalla had 18 sons, the eldest of whom succeeded him on the throne of Tripuri. The younger ones became rulers of mandalas (feudatory governors). The Ratnapuri Kalachuris descended from one of these younger sons. The new branch was established by Kalingaraja around 1000 CE. 

Kalingaraja conquered Dakshina Kosala region, and made Tummana his capital. His grandson Ratnaraja established Ratnapura (modern Ratanpur). The inscriptions of Kalingaraja's great-grandson Prithvideva I indicate that the Ratnapuri Kalachuris continued to rule as feudatories of the Tripuri Kalachuris.

In 1114 CE, Jajalladeva I invaded the Chindaka Naga territory to the south, annexing Kosala which was under Telugu Choda governorship. Jajalla-Deva I defeated Somesvara and took him prisoner, only releasing him at the intervention of his mother.

Prithvideva's son Ratnadeva II repulsed an invasion by Anantavarman Chodaganga, the king of the Eastern Ganga dynasty.

Decline
The last known sovereign ruler of the dynasty was Pratapa-malla. Pratapmalla continued his attempts to invade the frontiers of the Ganga territory along with his son Paramardi Dev. Anangabhima Deva III, the Eastern Ganga ruler, sent a large force under the command of his able Brahman commander, Vishnu. The two forces met face to face at the Seori Narayana village in undivided Sambalpur district  on the banks of the river called Bhima near the Vindhya hills and the Kalchuris were defeated for the first time in a major way by the Gangas. The Chateswara Temple Inscription of Anangabhima mentions that Vishnu terrorized the Kalachuri king so much that the latter "perceived Vishnu every where through out his kingdom."

Pratapmalla was taken prisoner and forced to cede the Sambalpur-Sonepur-Bolangir tracts along with parts of what is now Chhattishgarh state to the Ganga kingdom. Later with the advise of his minister Vishnu, Anangabhima established a diplomatic and matrimonial alliance with the Kalachuris by offering the hand of his daughter Chandrika in marriage to the Kalachuri prince, Parmardi Dev. Once the alliance was secured, the Ganga forces multiplied in strength. 
Parmardi Dev died in the final recorded battle of Narasingha Deva I's invasion of Bengal at Umurdan (Amarda in Mayurbhanj district). Paramardi Deva had led the Eastern Ganga forces with possibly the other conscript soldiers from the independent and Semi independent Hindu kingdoms in Eastern India against the Muslim rulers of Bengal under the command of his Eastern Ganga brother in law. The fate of his successors is not known.

List of rulers 
{
	"type": "FeatureCollection",
	"features": [
		{
			"type": "Feature",
			"properties": { "marker-symbol": "monument", "title": "Akaltara" },
			"geometry": { "type": "Point", "coordinates": [82.4238, 22.0245] }
		},
		{
			"type": "Feature",
			"properties": { "marker-symbol": "monument", "title": "Amora (or Amoda)" },
			"geometry": { "type": "Point", "coordinates": [81.5518, 21.6331] }
		},
		{
			"type": "Feature",
			"properties": { "marker-symbol": "monument", "title": "Bilaigarh" },
			"geometry": { "type": "Point", "coordinates": [82.7212, 21.6399] }
		},
		{
			"type": "Feature",
			"properties": { "marker-symbol": "monument", "title": "Dahkoni (or Daikoni)" },
			"geometry": { "type": "Point", "coordinates": [82.5429, 22.1130] }
		},
		{
			"type": "Feature",
			"properties": { "marker-symbol": "monument", "title": "Ghotia" },
			"geometry": { "type": "Point", "coordinates": [81.1773, 20.5904] }
		},
		{
			"type": "Feature",
			"properties": { "marker-symbol": "monument", "title": "Kharod" },
			"geometry": { "type": "Point", "coordinates": [82.5808, 21.7473] }
		},
		{
			"type": "Feature",
			"properties": { "marker-symbol": "monument", "title": "Koni" },
			"geometry": { "type": "Point", "coordinates": [82.1363, 22.1293] }
		},
		{
			"type": "Feature",
			"properties": { "marker-symbol": "monument", "title": "Lapha" },
			"geometry": { "type": "Point", "coordinates": [82.2855, 22.4533] }
		},
		{
			"type": "Feature",
			"properties": { "marker-symbol": "monument", "title": "Malhar (or Mallar)" },
			"geometry": { "type": "Point", "coordinates": [82.2904, 21.8899] }
		},
		{
			"type": "Feature",
			"properties": { "marker-symbol": "monument", "title": "Pali" },
			"geometry": { "type": "Point", "coordinates": [82.3262, 22.3753] }
		},
		{
			"type": "Feature",
			"properties": { "marker-symbol": "monument", "title": "Pasid" },
			"geometry": { "type": "Point", "coordinates": [82.1906, 21.8816] }
		},
		{
			"type": "Feature",
			"properties": { "marker-symbol": "monument", "title": "Paragaon" },
			"geometry": { "type": "Point", "coordinates": [82.1582, 21.7710] }
		},
		{
			"type": "Feature",
			"properties": { "marker-symbol": "monument", "title": "Pendrabandh or Pendrawan" },
			"geometry": { "type": "Point", "coordinates": [82.9429, 21.6534] }
		},
		{
			"type": "Feature",
			"properties": { "marker-symbol": "monument", "title": "Raipur" },
			"geometry": { "type": "Point", "coordinates": [81.6311, 21.2587] }
		},
		{
			"type": "Feature",
			"properties": { "marker-symbol": "monument", "title": "Rajim" },
			"geometry": { "type": "Point", "coordinates": [81.8849, 20.9629] }
		},
		{
			"type": "Feature",
			"properties": { "marker-symbol": "star", "marker-color": "000080", "title": "Ratanpur" },
			"geometry": { "type": "Point", "coordinates": [82.1623, 22.2862] }
		},
		{
			"type": "Feature",
			"properties": { "marker-symbol": "monument", "title": "Sarkhon (or Sarkho)" },
			"geometry": { "type": "Point", "coordinates": [82.5695, 22.0554] }
		},
		{
			"type": "Feature",
			"properties": { "marker-symbol": "monument", "title": "Shivrinarayan or Sheorinarayan" },
			"geometry": { "type": "Point", "coordinates": [82.5930, 21.7221] }
		}
	]
}
The following is a list of the Ratnapura Kalachuri rulers, with estimated period of their reigns:

 Kalinga-raja (1000-1020 CE)
 Kamala-raja (1020-1045 CE)
 Ratna-raja (1045-1065 CE), alias Ratna-deva I
 Prithvi-deva I (1065-1090 CE), alias Prithvisha
 Jajalla-deva I (1090-1120 CE)
 Ratna-Deva II (1120-1135 CE) (declared independence)
 Prithvi-deva II (1135-1165 CE)
 Jajalla-deva II (1165-1168 CE)
 Jagad-deva (1168-1178 CE)
 Ratna-deva III (1178-1200 CE)
 Pratapa-malla (1200-1225 CE)
 Parmardi Dev (governor of Eastern Gangas)

Coinage 

The Kalachuri rulers of Ratnapura issued gold, silver and copper coins, which bear the issuer's name in Nagari script. The coins feature four types of design:

 Gaja-shardula: Depicts a fight between a lion and an elephant. This design occurs on all their gold coins, and some copper coins.
 Hanumana: Depicts Hanuman in various poses, such as flying, crushing a demon (while sitting or standing), holding a trishula, or holding a flag. Only copper coins feature this design.
 Lion: Depicts a lion, sometimes with a human head. Featured on copper and silver coins.
 Dagger: Features a dagger on copper coins.

Hoards of their coins have been found at following places:

 Sanasari (or Sonsari)
 36 gold coins of Jajjaladeva
 96 gold coins of Ratnadeva
 459 gold coins of Prithvideva
 Sarangarh
 26 gold coins of Jajjaladeva
 29 gold coins of Ratnadeva
 1 gold coin of Prithvideva
 Bhagaund
 12 gold coins of Prithvideva
 Dadal-Seoni
 136 gold coins of Jajjaladeva, Ratnadeva and Prithvideva
 Bachchhanda
 9 gold coins, plus some other conins
 Ratanpur
 10 gold coins of Ratnadeva
 Sonpur and Baidyanatha
 11 gold coins of Jajjaladeva
 9 gold coins of Ratnadeva
 5 gold coins of Prithvideva

3 silver coins of Prithvideva were discovered from the Mahanadi riverbed near Balpur. Thousands of copper coins issued by them have also been discovered, including a hoard of 3900 copper coins at Dhanpur in Bilaspur district.

Inscriptions 

The inscriptions of the Ratnapura Kalachuri rulers have been discovered at several places in present-day Chhattisgarh:

 Prithvideva I: Amora (or Amoda), Lapha, Raipur
 Jajalladeva I: Pali, Ratanpur
 Ratandeva II: Akaltara, Paragaon, Shivrinarayan (or Sheorinarayan), Sarkhon (or Sarkho)
 Prithvideva II: Dahkoni (or Daikoni), Rajim, Bilaigarh, Koni, Amora, Ghotia,
 Jajalladeva II: Amora, Malhar (or Mallar), Shivrinarayan
 Ratnadeva III: Kharod, Pasid
 Pratapamalla: Pendrawan (or Pendrabandh) and Bilaigarh

See also 

 Mahamaya Temple in Ratanpur, said to be built by the Kalachuri king Ratnadeva

References

Bibliography 

 
 
 
 
 
 

Dynasties of India
History of Chhattisgarh